Troy Leon Gregg (April 29, 1948 – July 29, 1980) was the first condemned individual whose death sentence was upheld by the United States Supreme Court after the Court's decision in Furman v. Georgia invalidated all previously enacted death penalty laws in the United States. He later participated in the first successful escape from a Georgia death row, but was killed later that night, aged 32. His own murder remains officially unsolved.

Biography
Gregg was convicted of murdering Fred Edward Simmons and Bob Durwood Moore in order to rob them. The victims had given him and another man, Dennis Weaver, a ride when they were hitchhiking; Gregg admitted to shooting them, robbing them and stealing their car. The crime occurred on November 21, 1973. In Gregg v. Georgia, the Supreme Court held by a 7–2 majority that the State of Georgia could constitutionally put Gregg to death; Georgia, in common with Texas and Florida, had instituted a death penalty statute requiring a separate bifurcated trial proceeding to determine punishment in a capital case after the establishment of guilt, establishing a list of aggravating circumstances that must be present to consider a death penalty, and providing for review by the State Supreme Court. It also allowed for consideration of mitigating circumstances; on the same day, the Court, whose primary concern was racial bias in sentencing, rejected the North Carolina and Louisiana death penalty statutes for failure to allow for mitigating circumstances to be considered in sentencing.

Prison escape and death

On July 28, 1980, Gregg escaped together with three other condemned murderers, Timothy McCorquodale, Johnny L. Johnson, and David Jarrell, from Georgia State Prison in Reidsville in the first death row breakout in Georgia history. The four had altered their prison clothing to resemble the uniforms worn by correctional officers, then sawed through the bars of their cells and a window and walked along a ledge to a fire escape. They subsequently drove off in a car which had been left in the visitors' parking lot by one of the escapees' aunts. Their escape was not discovered until Gregg telephoned a newspaper to explain their reasons for doing so.

It has been alleged that Gregg was beaten to death later that night in a biker bar in North Carolina, and that his body was found in a lake. Gregg had supposedly been drinking heavily and attempted to assault a waitress. She rebuked his advances and he became violent towards her. One of the local bikers present took offense to Gregg's actions and assaulted and killed him; he and several other locals then dumped the body in a lake located behind the bar.  However, news reports from the time of the escape suggest that Gregg may actually have been murdered after getting into a fight with one of his fellow escapees, Timothy McCorquodale, and another man, James Cecil Horne, a member of the Outlaws Motorcycle Club. According to these reports, Gregg's body was discovered in the Catawba River. According to Gregg's autopsy, he died due to homicide by suffocation caused by swelling.

Horne was initially charged with Gregg's murder. Another man, William Flamont, was charged with being an accessory to Gregg's murder after-the-fact. Both men's charges were later dropped by a judge due to lack of evidence.

The other escapees were captured three days later hiding in a rundown house owned by William Flamont, another member of the Outlaws who was apparently friends with David Jarrell.

References

External links
Georgia Supreme Court opinion giving details of the case

1953 births
1980 deaths
American escapees
American people convicted of murder
American prisoners sentenced to death
Deaths by beating in the United States
Escapees from Georgia (U.S. state) detention
People convicted of murder by Georgia (U.S. state)
Prisoners sentenced to death by Georgia (U.S. state)